Preston Jones may refer to:

 Preston Jones (playwright) (1936–1979), American playwright
 Preston Jones (gridiron football) (born 1970), American football player
 Preston Jones (actor) (born 1983), American actor